The Royal Air Force Gliding & Soaring Association is a British organisation which provides recreational flying in gliders to RAF personnel.

Purpose
The Royal Air Force Gliding & Soaring Association (RAFGSA) is a voluntary organisation which exists to provide recreational flying to all RAF servicemen and women, in particular those normally employed in ground duties.
The RAFGSA Centre is at RAF Halton, employing a full-time staff to provide central organisational, training and workshop facilities.

The Joint Services Gliding Centre (JSGC), located at the RAFGSA Chilterns Centre, RAF Halton, is part of the Joint Service Adventurous Training (JSAT) Air Sports organisation and provides training courses for military personnel.

History
In 1945, the British Air Forces of Occupation (BAFO) in Germany began using captured German gliders to provide recreational flying for RAF personnel. This resulted in a demand for similar facilities in the United Kingdom, and the Royal Air Force Gliding & Soaring Association was founded in 1949. The first aircraft, a Slingsby T.21 and a Prefect, were bought in March 1950 and stationed at RAF Detling. By 1952 27 gliders were being operated at seven clubs around the UK.

In October 1963 the RAFGSA Centre was established at RAF Bicester, absorbing the Windrushers Gliding Club which had been formed in January 1956 at RAF Little Rissington, later moving to Bicester.

In June 2004 the Centre moved to RAF Halton.

Andy Gough
Warrant Officer Arthur William Charles  Gough BEM, (b. 2 June 1924), founded and for some 20 years ran the RAF gliding centre at Bicester as its Chief Flying Instructor. He was killed whilst giving an aerobatic display in a LET L-13 Blaník glider whil performing an aerobatics display at RAF Brize Norton on 12 June 1982. He was then 58 years old.WO Gough is also included on the armed forces memorial and armed forces roll of honour.

In 1985 the then Sergeant Andy Gough was feted for his performance in the 1985 RAFGSA Championships when he flew cross country from Aston Down Airfield, near Cirencester across the North Sea to Holland, thus beating the previous record of 315 miles by a further 3 miles.
The 'Andy Gough Memorial Trophy' is awarded annually to an outstanding  RAFGSA member

Other notable Bicester instructors
Jock Wishard Ron Newall, Ian Strachan, Con Greaves, & Paddy Kearon were senior gliding instructors as well as RAFGSA or BGA competition pilots

Dick Stratton
Richard B Stratton (1923 - 2007) FRAeS was Chief engineer was also a licensed (and sometimes controversial) CAA inspector He joined the RAF with a wartime commission and served as a flight engineer on Short Sunderland flying boat-bombers until 1949 when he joined Sanders Roe as a test pilot on the he flight test programmes on the Saunders Roe Princess, and the Saunders-Roe SR.53 rocket plane

He was a notable pioneer of aviation engineering and later an innovative influence in light aircraft and gliding practices especially safe aerotowing, winching and  scroll-gear machining and elastic rope bungee launching (described below) .

He also  successfully converted (after some difficulty with the CAA) military de Havilland Canada DHC-1 Chipmunks to the civil register as suitable for  aerotow, which bought some notoriety and financial reward to the RAFGSA in the late 1960's to early 1970's

Controversies
This conversion was quite controversial because military chipmunks had a Coffman cartridge starters which required the services of a qualified armourer and a licensed pyrotechnic store. Dick disconnected the linkage, but not the assembly, as it would have altered the balance of the aircraft. Starting the motor by swinging the propeller can present an extremely dangerous risk of decapitation, and accordingly the CAA was extremely reluctant to certify the aircraft, until Dick pointed out that it was not actually illegal and provided done by a trained mechanic, reasonably practicable. The other disputed modifications included a plywood seat panel over the pilot’s parachute well and a dymotape embossed plastic label inscribed IAS VNE 120KT (indicated air speed velocity never to be exceeded is a mandatory 120 nautical miles an hour (222Km/h!)

Dick later converted some with  Chipmunks with Gypsy major airframes to accept  to Lycoming engines and successfully fought for MOGAS (automotive gasoline) to be used in some cases where the AVGAS (Kerosene aviation fuel) had been specified. He continued to instruct, aerotow and innovate well into the 1980's

Clubs
Apart from the RAFGSA Centre at RAF Halton, there are six regional clubs run on a voluntary basis and based at or near RAF stations. Each offers initial training for novices as well as cross-country flying for more advanced pilots.

RAFGSA Chilterns Gliding Centre, RAF Halton
Bannerdown Gliding Club, Keevil
Cranwell Gliding Club, RAF Cranwell
Fenland Gliding Club, RAF Marham
Fulmar Gliding Club, Easterton
Kestrel Gliding Club, RAF Odiham
RAF Shawbury Gliding Club, RAF Shawbury

Aircraft
Approximately 60 gliders were in use in 2010, including the following types:
Grob G102 Astir
Grob G 109B
Rolladen-Schneider LS8-18
Scheibe SF25 Falke
Schempp-Hirth Discus
Schempp-Hirth Discus-2cT
Schempp-Hirth Duo Discus
Schempp-Hirth Janus CT
Schempp-Hirth Ventus-2cT
Schleicher K 8B
Schleicher ASK 13
Schleicher ASK 18
Schleicher ASK 21
Slingsby T61 Falke

Six Chipmunk and two Pawnee tugs were also in use.

See also
Gliding
Gliding competitions
Gliders
Air Training Corps

References

External links
 

Aviation organisations based in the United Kingdom
Aylesbury Vale
Gliding in the United Kingdom
Gliding associations
Organisations based in Buckinghamshire
Sport in Buckinghamshire
Sports organizations established in 1949
1949 establishments in the United Kingdom
Military gliding